Handberg is a surname. Notable people with the surname include:

Gert Handberg (born 1969), former international motorcycle speedway rider
Linnéa Handberg Lund (born 1976), Danish Eurodance musician

See also
Sandberg (surname)